Edward J. Breslin (1940 – 9 February 2021), known as Éamonn Breslin, was an Irish Gaelic footballer who played as a forward for club sides Inchicore Hibernians and Ballyfermot Gaels and was a member of the Dublin senior football team from 1963 until 1968.

Career

Breslin played his Gaelic football for Inchicore Hibernians and Ballyfermot Gaels, with both teams participating in the Dublin Junior Championship. He earned a call-up to the Dublin senior football team and was an unused substitute on the team that beat Galway in the 1963 All-Ireland final. He also claimed two Leinster Championship titles. Breslin is probably best remembered for becoming the first player to score a headed goal in Gaelic football, a feat he achieved in a National League game against Laois in November 1964. His inter-county career was short-lived and he switched to rugby not long after scoring his famous goal, joining the Monkstown club in south Dublin.

Personal life and death
Having served his time as a bricklayer, Breslin subsequently worked as a car salesman and finished his career with Fort Motors in Cromwellsfort Road in South Dublin in 2006. He died on 9 February 2021.

Honours
Dublin
 All-Ireland Senior Football Championship: 1963
 Leinster Senior Football Championship: 1963, 1965

References

1940 births
2021 deaths
Dublin inter-county Gaelic footballers
Monkstown Football Club players
People from Ballyfermot
Sportspeople from South Dublin (county)
Date of birth missing